The 2013–14 UTSA Roadrunners men's basketball team represented the University of Texas at San Antonio during the 2013–14 NCAA Division I men's basketball season. The Roadrunners, led by eighth year head coach Brooks Thompson, played their home games at the Convocation Center and were first year members of Conference USA. They finished the season 8–22, 4–12 in C-USA play to finish in a tie for fourteenth place. They lost in the first round of the C-USA tournament to East Carolina.

Roster

Schedule

|-
!colspan=9 style="background:#E74F00; color:#00438C;"| Exhibition
 
|-
!colspan=9 style="background:#E74F00; color:#00438C;"| Regular season

|-
!colspan=9 style="background:#E74F00; color:#00438C;"| 2014 Conference USA tournament

References

UTSA Roadrunners men's basketball seasons
UTSA
UTSA Roadrunners
UTSA Roadrunners